George Kuzmicz (May 24, 1952 – September 25, 2015) was a Canadian former professional ice hockey player who played in the World Hockey Association (WHA). Kuzmicz played parts of two WHA seasons with the Toronto Toros. He was drafted in the ninth round of the 1972 NHL Amateur Draft by the Detroit Red Wings. As a youth, he played in the 1964 Quebec International Pee-Wee Hockey Tournament with a minor ice hockey team from Cedar Hill.

Career statistics

Awards and honors

1973–74 Cornell Boosters Award (dedication and team play)
1973–74 Ivy League First All-Star Team

References

External links

1952 births
Living people
AHCA Division I men's ice hockey All-Americans
Buffalo Norsemen players
Canadian ice hockey defencemen
Cornell Big Red men's ice hockey players
Detroit Red Wings draft picks
Ice hockey people from Montreal
Mohawk Valley Comets (NAHL) players
Toronto Toros players